Alticorpus is a small genus of cichlids endemic to the deep waters of Lake Malawi in Africa.

Species
There are currently five or six recognized species in this genus:
 Alticorpus geoffreyi Snoeks & Walapa, 2004
 Alticorpus macrocleithrum (Stauffer & McKaye, 1985)
 Alticorpus mentale Stauffer & McKaye, 1988
 Alticorpus peterdaviesi (W. E. Burgess & H. R. Axelrod, 1973)
 Alticorpus profundicola Stauffer & McKaye, 1988

References

 
Pseudocrenilabrinae

Fish described in 1988
Cichlid genera
Taxa named by Jay Richard Stauffer Jr.
Taxa named by Kenneth Robert McKaye